Cymatopleura is a genus of diatoms belonging to the family Surirellaceae.

Species:

Cymatopleura acutiformis 
Cymatopleura albaregiensis 
Cymatopleura angulata

References

Surirellales
Diatom genera